The minor red bat (Lasiurus minor) is a species of bat from the family Vespertilioninae. It is found in the Bahamas, Hispaniola (both the Dominican Republic and Haiti), and Puerto Rico in the Caribbean, though there are only six known individuals in the latter.

Diet and behaviour
The minor red bat is a solitary, insectivorous species that forages in open areas and rests among the leaves of trees. It is a swift flier, though it is not highly maneuverable.

Conservation
Hurricanes, habitat destruction, and human population growth are several factors leading to a decreasing population trend, and the minor red bat is listed as vulnerable by the IUCN Red List due to ongoing population reduction and a small geographic range.

See also 

 Desert red bat
 Eastern red bat
 Seminole bat

References 

Lasiurus
Bats of the Caribbean
Mammals of the Bahamas
Mammals of the Dominican Republic
Mammals of Haiti
Mammals of Puerto Rico
Mammals described in 1931
Taxa named by Gerrit Smith Miller Jr.